John "J. J." Trujillo (born October 9, 1975), is a former Major League Baseball pitcher. In 2007  he pitched for the Newark Bears of the Atlantic League of Professional Baseball, before his contract was purchased by the Philadelphia Phillies who assigned him to Class A Clearwater of the Florida State League, helping them to the league championship. Trujillo then returned to the Bears, helping them to the Atlantic League championship, giving him two separate league championships in one year.

Trujillo is one of only two pitchers in major league history to surrender a game-ending home run to the first batter he faced in the majors. On June 11, 2002, he began the 10th inning of an interleague game against the Baltimore Orioles and promptly gave up a walk-off home run to Tony Batista.

He was born in Corpus Christi, Texas.

References

External links

Major League Baseball pitchers
San Diego Padres players
Baseball players from Texas
Dallas Baptist Patriots baseball players
1975 births
Living people
Newark Bears players
Coastal Bend Aviators players
Coastal Bend Thunder players
Johnstown Johnnies players
Clearwater Threshers players
Fort Wayne Wizards players
Lake Elsinore Storm players
Mobile BayBears players
Portland Beavers players
Reading Phillies players
Wichita Wranglers players